The Marxist–Leninist Students' Federation (in Portuguese: Federação dos Estudantes Marxistas-Leninistas) was the students wing of the MRPP. FEML played an important role in the early years of the party.

By far the most famous former FEML cadre is José Manuel Durão Barroso.

Student wings of political parties in Portugal
Student wings of communist parties